The 2010 AFC Futsal Championship was held in Tashkent, Uzbekistan from 23 May to 30 May 2010.

Qualification

Venues

Draw 
The draw for the 2010 AFC Futsal Championship was held on 20 March 2010 in Tashkent, Uzbekistan.

Group stage

Group A

Group B

Group C

Group D

Knockout stage

Quarter-finals

Semi-finals

Third place play-off

Final

Awards 

 Most Valuable Player
 Mohammad Taheri
 Top Scorer
 Mohammad Taheri (13 goals)
 Fair-Play Award

Goalscorers
13 goals
  Mohammad Taheri

11 goals
  Masoud Daneshvar

7 goals

  Zhang Xi
  Mostafa Tayyebi
  Mohammad Reza Zahmatkesh

6 goals

  Tom Rogić
  Suphawut Thueanklang
  Nodir Elibaev

5 goals

  Li Xin
  Javad Asghari Moghaddam
  Ali Asghar Hassanzadeh
  Karrar Mohsin
  Takanori Kamisawa
  Kensuke Takahashi
  Artur Yunusov

4 goals

  Liang Shuang
  Fang Ching-jen
  Kassem Kawsan
  Jeong Eui-hyun
  Kim Jeong-nam
  Kiatiyot Chalarmkhet
  Dilshod Irsaliev

3 goals

  Greg Giovenali
  Hu Jie
  Mohammad Keshavarz
  Majid Raeisi
  Mustafa Bachay
  Tetsuya Murakami
  Mitsuyoshi Matsumiya
  Nobuya Osodo
  Dilshat Kadyrov
  Azamat Mendibaev
  Hassan Chaito
  Khaled Takaji
  Sherzod Jumaev
  Alisher Ulmasov
  Lertchai Issarasuwipakorn
  Fakhriddin Samegov
  Nguyễn Trọng Thiện
  Trần Hoàng Vinh

2 goals

  Huang He
  Wang Wei
  Zhang Xiao
  Ali Haidar
  Mohammad Hashemzadeh
  Shota Hoshi
  Yusuke Komiyama
  Omar Al-Jaser
  Gulbek Abdurazakov
  Hayssam Atwi
  Khurshed Makhmudov
  Panuwat Janta
  Natee Thusiri
  Konstantin Sviridov
  Hurshid Tajibaev
  Huỳnh Bá Tuấn

1 goal

  Shervin Adeli
  Daniel Fogarty
  Danny Ngaluafe
  Tobias Seeto
  Zhang Jiong
  Zheng Tao
  Lo Chih-an
  Wang Chih-sheng
  Deny Handoyo
  Benny Hera
  Vennard Hutabarat
  Sayan Karmadi
  Jaelani Ladjanibi
  Socrates Matulessy
  Hairul Saleh Ohorella
  Jefri Purba
  Ali Rahnama
  Hussein Abd-Ali
  Abdul-Karim Ghazi
  Admon Hanna
  Zaman Majid
  Kenichiro Kogure
  Manabu Takita
  Akira Yoshida
  Salem Al-Mekaimi
  Salem Aman
  Hamzah Mohammad
  Nurjan Djetybaev
  Vadim Kondratkov
  Seok Dae-sung
  Shin Jong-hoon
  Fatkhulo Fatkhulloev
  Dilshod Vasiev
  Ekkapong Suratsawang
  Kritsada Wongkaeo
  Mergen Atayev
  Annaberdy Chariyev
  Bayrammurat Esenmamedov
  Mekan Muhamedmuradov
  Nuryagdy Muhammedov
  Makhsud Fayzullaev
  Nguyễn Hoàng Giang
  Nguyễn Quốc Bảo
  Trương Quốc Tuấn

Own goals

  Erkin Tabaldiev (for Thailand)
  Trương Quốc Tuấn (for Thailand)

References

External links 
 Official website

AFC Futsal Championship
F
Championship
International futsal competitions hosted by Uzbekistan
21st century in Tashkent
Sport in Tashkent